State Route 122 (SR 122) is a  state highway that travels west-to-east through portions of Thomas, Brooks, Lowndes, Lanier, Clinch, and Ware counties in the southern part of the U.S. state of Georgia. The highway connects the cities of Thomasville and Waycross, via Lakeland.

Route description
SR 122 begins at an intersection with US 19/US 84/SR 3/SR 38/SR 300 (Thomasville Bypass) in Thomasville, in Thomas County. The road heads to the northeast, passing the Thomasville Regional Airport, and travels through rural areas of the county until it reaches the town of Pavo. There, it has a brief concurrency with SR 33. The concurrency ends at the Thomas–Brooks county line. The road heads northeast, intersecting SR 333 (Moultrie Road) and SR 133, before curving to the east to enter Barney. It intersects SR 76 in town. Farther to the east, it crosses over the Little River into Lowndes County. It then has an interchange with Interstate 75 (I-75) in Hahira. At this interchange, US 41/SR 7, which are concurrent with I-75 south of this interchange, become concurrent with SR 122 into the central part of town. Northeast of Haira is a bridge over the Withlacoochee River. It intersects SR 125 (Bemiss Road/Valdosta Ray City Highway) at the meeting point of Lowndes, Berrien, and Lanier counties. The highway parallels most of the northern part of Banks Lake, and intersects SR 122 Connector, prior to entering Lakeland. In Lakeland, it intersects SR 11 Connector (North Pecan Street). Then, it meets SR 129/SR 11/SR 37 (West Thigpen Avenue). About 2 blocks later is US 221/SR 31/SR 135 (South Valdosta Road). At this intersection, US 221/SR 31 join the concurrency to the east. At Oak Street, SR 135 Bypass joins the concurrency for a short while. At College Street is the southern terminus of SR 11 Bypass. Also, SR 135 Bypass departs to the north. Farther to the east-northeast is the Alapaha River. US 129/SR 11/SR 37 depart to the east, while US 221/SR 31/SR 122 head to the north, and then SR 122 departs to the northeast. After entering Clinch County, the highway has a very brief concurrency with SR 168. Northwest of Homerville, it intersects US 441/SR 89 (Pearson Highway). The route continues through mostly rural areas of the county and enters Ware County. SR 122 heads northeast until it meets its eastern terminus, an intersection with US 1/US 23/US 82/SR 4/SR 520 (South Georgia Parkway), west of Waycross.

SR 122 is not part of the National Highway System, a system of roadways important to the nation's economy, defense, and mobility.

Major intersections

Related route

State Route 122 Connector (SR 122 Connector) exists entirely within the central part of Lanier County, a short distance west of Lakeland.

It begins on the shores of Banks Lake, at an intersection with the SR 122 mainline. It heads northwest to an intersection with Corbitt Road. The highway continues to the northwest until it meets its northern terminus, an intersection US 129/SR 11/SR 37.

SR 122 Connector is not part of the National Highway System, a system of roadways important to the nation's economy, defense, and mobility.

See also

References

External links

 
 Georgia Roads (Routes 121 - 140)
 Georgia State Route 122

122
Transportation in Thomas County, Georgia
Transportation in Brooks County, Georgia
Transportation in Lowndes County, Georgia
Transportation in Lanier County, Georgia
Transportation in Clinch County, Georgia
Transportation in Ware County, Georgia